Ángel Gabilondo Pujol (born 1 March 1949) is a Spanish university professor, currently serving as the 6th Ombudsman of Spain.

Between 2009 and 2011, he was Minister of Education in José Luis Rodríguez Zapatero's Cabinet.

In June 2011, he received the Medalla de Oro for the Universidad de Málaga. On 30 December 2011 he received a condecoration for the Order of Charles III and also the Orden de Alfonso X el Sabio on 26 December 2014.

In 2015, he was named Spanish Socialist Workers' Party's candidate for the Community of Madrid 2015 election. He returned to be a candidate for the 2016 election. Suggested by Pedro Sánchez, he was again the PSOE candidate for the 2019 election.

In October 2018, he offered himself to be the president of Madrid, in order to succeed Ángel Garrido.

In October 2021, after an agreement between major parties of the Cortes Generales, he was nominated to be the 6th Spanish Ombudsman. The Cortes Generales Joint Committee on Relations with the Ombudsman ratified the nomination on 27 October 2021 and it sent the candidacy to the Plenary for a final voting.

He is the brother of Spanish journalist Iñaki Gabilondo.

Publications

References

External links 
 

 

1949 births
Autonomous University of Madrid alumni
Living people
Politicians from San Sebastián
Members of the 10th Assembly of Madrid
Members of the Socialist Parliamentary Group (Assembly of Madrid)
Members of the 11th Assembly of Madrid
Ombudsmen in Spain